Joaquim Rodríguez (born 1979) is a Spanish cyclist.

Joaquín Rodríguez may also refer to:

Costillares (1743–1800), considered the father of modern bullfighting, born Joaquín Rodríguez
Joaquín Rodríguez Espinar (born 1982), Spanish footballer